These are lists of prominent American Jews, arranged by field of activity.

Academics
 Biologists and physicians
 Chemists
 Computer scientists
 Economists
 Historians
 Linguists
 Mathematicians
 Philosophers
 Physicists
 Psychologists

Activists
Activists

Artists
 Architects
 Cartoonists
 Composers
 Photographers
 Visual artists

Business
 Businesspeople
 in finance
 in media
 in real estate
 in retail

Entertainers
Composers
Entertainers (actors and musicians)

Legal system
Jurists
Supreme Court Justices

Military

Military

Politicians
Politicians

Sportspeople
Sportspeople

Writers
 Authors
 Journalists
 Playwrights
 Poets

References
 The Jewish Phenomenon: The 7 Keys to the Wealth of a People, by Steven Silbiger, 2010, Evans Publishing.

Jews,United States